The 2023 NRLW Premiership will be the sixth professional season of Women's rugby league in Australia. As announced by the governing body, the National Rugby League, the number of teams will increase from six to ten. 
The duration of the season was confirmed by the NRL in a media release on 14 February 2023 as nine rounds followed by semi-finals and a Grand Final. Contracted players will also be paid for a seven-week preparation period prior to the commencement of the competition, plus two weeks leave, for a total of 20 weeks. The contract period for players is, however, twelve months.

The announcement also confirmed a rise in the salary cap from $350,000 in 2022 to $900,000 in 2023.

Teams 
The Line-up of teams will increase from six to ten. Two of the new clubs announced in October 2022 the appointment of their NRLW coach for the 2023 season.

Scheduling
The season will see the ten teams play each other once across nine rounds, with a two-week final series to follow involving the top four teams in semi-finals with the winners meeting in the Grand Final. 

Scheduling of the season has allowed for:
 An All Stars match on 11 February 2022.
 State Competitions in which most NRLW players will participate.
 New South Wales  11 rounds and a Finals Series from 4 February 2023 to early May 2023; and 
 Queensland  7 rounds and a Finals Series from 11 March 2023 to early May 2023;
 A seven-week preparation period.
 Two weeks of leave. 
 A two-match Women's State of Origin series.

The stating date of the 2023 season is yet to be advised. If the nine rounds and final series are to be played on successive weekends with the NRLW Grand Final on the same day or weekend as the men's NRL Grand Final on Sunday, 1 October 2023, then the season will commence on the weekend of 22-23 July 2023.

Players and transfers

Player signings for the 2023 season were effectively placed on hold until an in principle agreement between the NRL and RLPA was reached. This was announced on 14 February 2023. 

The 2023 season salary cap for clubs is $900,000 and the minimum wage for contracted players is $30,000. Squad size is 24 players plus 4 development players. Clubs are required to fill their 24 player roster by 24 May 2023.

Table last updated: 14 February 2022.

References

External links 
 

NRL Women
NRL Women